Lake Sevettijärvi a medium-sized lake in the Näätämöjoki main catchment area. It is located in the Lapland region of Finland. On the western shore there is the village Sevettijärvi. The inhabitants there are mainly Skolt Sami people.

See also
List of lakes in Finland

References

Lakes of Inari, Finland